Fereej Al Asmakh is a district in Qatar, located in the municipality of Ad Dawhah. Administratively, it is part of Zone 5, along with Al Najada and Barahat Al Jufairi.

It is one of the smaller and older districts of Doha. As such, the district is considered as a good example of Qatar's cultural identity, which has led to several development programs by the government to rehabilitate its dilapidated structures.

References

Communities in Doha